Disability Rights International (DRI), formerly Mental Disability Rights International, is a Washington, DC based human rights advocacy organization dedicated to promoting the human rights and full participation in society of persons with disabilities worldwide. DRI documents conditions, publishes reports, and promotes international oversight of the rights of persons with disabilities.

DRI was founded in 1993 by attorney Eric Rosenthal and jointly established by the Washington College of Law Center for Human Rights and the Bazelon Center for Mental Health Law. Since 1993, DRI has expanded offices into three countries including Serbia, Mexico, and Ukraine.

Reports and press coverage
Since its founding, DRI has published reports on conditions and experiences of persons with disabilities including: 
 Human Rights and Mental Health: Uruguay (1995) 
 Human Rights and Mental Health: Hungary (1997) 
 Human Rights and Mental Health, Mexico (2000)
 Human Rights of People with Mental Disabilities, Kosovo (2002)
 Human RIghts and Mental Health in Peru (2004)
 Behind Closed Doors: Human Rights Abuses in the Psychiatric Facilities, Orphanages and Rehabilitation Centers of Turkey (2005)
  Hidden Suffering: Romania's Segregation and Abuse of Infants and Children with Disabilities (2006)
 Ruined Lives: Segregations from Society in Argentina's Psychiatric Asylums (2007)
  Torment Not Treatment: Serbia's Segregation and Abuse of Children and Adults with Disabilities (2007)
 The Rights of Children with Disabilities in Vietnam:Bringing Vietnam's Laws into compliance with the UN Convention on the Rights of Persons with Disabilities (2009)
 Torture Not Treatment:Electric Shock and Long-Term Restraint in the United States on Children and Adults with Disabilities at the Judge Rotenberg Center (2010)
 Abandoned and Disappeared:Mexico's Segregation and Abuse of Children and Adults with Disabilities (2010)
 Guatemala: Precautionary Measures Petition to the Inter-American Commission on Human Rights (2012)
 The Rights of Persons with Mental Disabilities in the new Mexican Criminal Justice System (2013)

DRI has had coverage of their work by the following newspapers: New York Times, Washington Post, CNN International, BBC World Service, ABC News, Voice of America, NPR, NBC, Univision, Independent (London), Ha'Aretz and others. Moreover, DRI has an article in UNICEF's 2013 State of the World's Children Report focused on children with disabilities.

On June 27, 2009, MindFreedom International announced that Laurie Ahern had been named president of DRI.

Worldwide campaign to end the institutionalization of children
Founded by President Laurie Ahern, DRI has led a campaign worldwide campaign to end the institutionalization of children. The goal of the Worldwide Campaign to End the Institutionalization of Children, is to challenge underlying policies that lead to abuses against children on a global scale.  One of the main drivers of institutionalization – particularly in developing countries – is the use of misdirected foreign assistance funding to build new institutions or rebuild old crumbling facilities, instead of providing assistance and access to services for families who want to keep their children at home. Disability Rights International will document the role of international funders in perpetuating the segregation of children with disabilities.

Findings by Disability Rights International on conditions of institutionalized children includes:

– In Mexico, there is almost no official oversight of children in private institutions, and children have literally "disappeared" from public record. Preliminary evidence suggests that children with disabilities have been "trafficked" into forced labor or sex slavery;

– In the United States, children with autism and other mental disabilities living at a residential school in Massachusetts are being given electric shocks as a form of "behavior modification";

– We have found children with autism in Paraguay and Uruguay locked in cages;

– In Turkey, children as young as 9 years old were being given electro-shock treatments without anesthesia until we exposed the barbaric treatment;

– In Romania, we found teenagers with both mental and physical disabilities hidden away in an adult psychiatric institution – near death from intentional starvation. Some of the teens weighed less than 30 pounds;

– In Russia, we uncovered thousands of neglected infants and babies in the "lying down rooms", where row after row of babies with disabilities both live and die in their cribs.

International policy advocacy 
DRI has advocated extensively in over 25 countries. Primarily, DRI has focused on: 
 Promoting worldwide recognition of abuse as torture
 Recognition of international disability rights in the United States 
 Promoting the CRPD in international oversight and enforcement systems
 Working to end international support for new institutions and segregated service systems

As a result of DRI's work: 
 Brought about worldwide recognition of disability rights as international human rights
 Documented abuses and supported activists in 25 countries of Central and Eastern Europe, the Americas, Asia and the Middle East
 Helped to draft the United Nations Convention on the Rights of Persons with Disabilities, recently signed by President Obama and ratified by more than 70 countries
 Exposed and closed abusive institutions and fostered the creation of human and dignified services, allowing people with disabilities to live in the community
 Eradicated the use of cages in several countries where children and adults with disabilities were imprisoned for yearsUsed international human rights legal systems to protect the human rights of people with disabilities
 Stopped the use of unmodified ECT (shock treatment without anesthesia) in Turkey to which more than 15,000 children and adults were subject every year
 Pressured the European Union (EU) to add disability rights to the EU's human rights considerations for EU membershipCreated disability advocacy movements in countries where there were none
 Succeeded in including protection for children and adults with disabilities, warehoused and abused for a lifetime, under the United Nations Convention Against Torture

Women's rights initiative
DRI's Women's Rights Initiative focuses on challenging the "double discrimination" women with disabilities face—both because of their gender and disability. DRI documents and exposes abuses against this population, sensitizes government authorities and civil society organizations about the importance of addressing disability from a gender perspective, and works with women's rights groups to encourage them to include a disability perspective in their agenda. DRI's recent work in this area includes:

Mexico— DRI helped establish a Women's Committee formed by women with a psychosocial disability that belong to the Colectivo Chuhcan, Mexico's first advocacy organization run by persons with psychosocial disabilities. DRI helps empower these activists to become spokespersons for women with psychosocial disabilities at the local and national level.

Guatemala—  After documenting sexual abuse and trafficking of women and girls with disabilities in a Guatemalan psychiatric hospital, DRI filed a petition with before the Inter-American Commission on Human Rights (IACHR). The IACHR ordered Guatemala to take urgent measures to protect the women detained in this facility. DRI is currently working with the Guatemalan government to ensure that an end is brought to the sexual abuse and trafficking against women and girls.

Ukraine— Ukraine's local office focuses on the rights of women and children who are institutionalized or at-risk of institutionalization. DRI has documented numerous abuses against women in Ukraine's institutions, including: non-consensual medical abortions; forced birth control and gynecological exams; and forced separation of mothers from their children. DRI's local office in Ukraine also reaches out to and empowers women recovering from eating disorders—a population which is at high-risk for psychiatric institutionalization.

Serbia controversy
Notably, in November 2007, DRI released a controversial report on conditions in psychiatric institutions in Serbia. DRI's report, which showed pictures of emaciated children and adults tied to beds, called many of the abuses "tantamount to torture." On an NBC News report before the report released, a Serbian official admitted that problems existed. Following the release of the report, however, Serbian Prime Minister Vojislav Kostunica described the allegations raised as "malicious." Five days after the report released, members of the European Committee for the Prevention of Torture arrived to assess the problem of abuse in mental institutions in Serbia. Serbian government representatives promised to improve conditions in Serbian institutions.

Awards

Henry Viscardi Achievement Awards (2013)

Laurie Ahern, President of DRI received the prestigious award given by Viscardi center to exceptional leaders in the field of disability activism.

Charles Bronfman Award (2013) 

DRI was awarded the Charles Bronfman Award recognizing DRI's work in awakening the world's conscience to protect the human rights of children and adults with disabilities; documenting the segregation and abusive treatment of people with disabilities in dozens of countries; training and inspiring disability and human rights activists; and appealing to governments and world bodies to protect a vulnerable and overlooked population.

Senator Paul and Mrs. Sheila Wellstone Mental Health Visionary Award (2009)

Disability Rights International was awarded the 2009 Wellstone Award. The Award was established by the Washington Psychiatric Society to recognize visionary work and actions benefiting parity in mental health, and fighting the stigma of discrimination of mental illness.

American Psychiatric Association's Human Rights Award (2009)

Disability Rights International was awarded the APA's 2009 Human Rights Award, bestowed by the Council on Global Psychiatry, a component of the APA. The Human Rights Award was established in 1990 to recognize individuals and organizations that exemplify the capacity of human beings to protect others from damage related to the professional, scientific, and clinical dimensions of mental health, at the hands of other human beings. Past recipients of the APA Human Rights Award include President Jimmy Carter and Roselyn Carter, Senators Paul Wellstone and Pete Domenici, Justice Richard Goldstone and Physicians for Human Rights.

Henry B. Betts Award (2008)

Eric Rosenthal, executive director of Disability Rights International was awarded the prestigious Henry B. Betts Award by the American Association of People with Disabilities. The Betts Award is named in honor of Henry B. Betts, M.D., a pioneer in the field of rehabilitation medicine who started his career with the Rehabilitation Institute of Chicago in 1964 and has devoted himself to improving the quality of life for people with disabilities.

Thomas J. Dodd Award in International Justice and Human Rights (2007)

The Thomas J. Dodd Research Center at the University of Connecticut awarded Disability Rights International the 2007 Thomas J. Dodd Prize in International Justice and Human Rights Prize. Disability Rights International was awarded for its efforts in advancing the cause of international justice and global human rights.

References 

Health and disability rights organizations in the United States
Mental health organizations in Washington, D.C.